The 1964 United States Senate election in New York was held on November 3, 1964. Incumbent Republican U.S. Senator Kenneth Keating ran for re-election to a second term, but was defeated by Robert F. Kennedy.

Nominations
The Socialist Labor state convention met on March 29, and nominated John Emanuel. The Republican state convention met on August 31, and re-nominated the incumbent U.S. Senator Kenneth B. Keating. The Conservative state convention met on August 31 at Saratoga Springs, New York, and nominated Prof. Henry Paolucci.

The Democratic Party state convention met on September 1, and nominated U.S. Attorney General Robert F. Kennedy on the first ballot with 968 votes against 153 for Congressman Samuel S. Stratton. The Liberal Party met on September 1, and endorsed Kennedy. The Socialist Workers Party filed a petition to nominate candidates on September 7. Richard Garza was nominated.

Campaign
John English, a Nassau County leader who helped John F. Kennedy during the 1960 presidential election, encouraged Robert Kennedy to oppose Keating. At the time, Samuel S. Stratton, a member of the United States House of Representatives from New York's 35th congressional district, was considered the most likely Democratic candidate. At first, Kennedy resisted. After President Kennedy's assassination, Robert Kennedy remained as Attorney General for Lyndon B. Johnson. However, Johnson and Kennedy feuded. Kennedy decided to run for the Senate in New York in August, and resigned from the Cabinet on September 3, 1964. While many reform Democrats resisted Kennedy, support from Robert F. Wagner, Jr., and party bosses like Charles A. Buckley, of The Bronx, and Peter J. Crotty, of Buffalo, helped Kennedy win the nomination at the party convention.

During the campaign, Kennedy was frequently met by large crowds. Keating accused Kennedy of being a carpetbagger from Massachusetts.  Kennedy responded to these charges in a televised town meeting by saying, "If the senator of the state of New York is going be selected on who's lived here the longest, then I think people are going vote for my opponent. If it's going be selected on who's got the best New York accent, then I think I'm probably out too. But I think if it's going be selected on the basis of who can make the best United States senator, I think I'm still in the contest."

Results
The Democratic/Liberal candidate was elected. Campaign help from President Lyndon B. Johnson, as well as the Democratic landslide after the assassination of John F. Kennedy, helped carry Kennedy into office, as Kennedy polled about 1.1 million votes less in New York than Johnson did.

The incumbent Keating was defeated.

See also
 1964 New York state election
 1964 United States Senate elections

References

External links
 Images from the Kennedy campaign

Robert F. Kennedy
1964
1964 New York (state) elections
New York